Diego Seminario De Col (born May 13, 1989) is a Peruvian actor and industrial designer. He is most known for his role of Gianfranco Bogani in the hit Peruvian television show Al fondo hay sitio. He graduated from the Pontifical Catholic University of Peru.

Television
 Esta sociedad as El Chato
 Al fondo hay sitio as Gianfranco "Gianguapo" Bogani

References

External links
 
 Video interview
 Interview

Peruvian male television actors
1989 births
Living people
Place of birth missing (living people)